The NCCA 3 Day Championship (previously the Minor Counties Cricket Championship) is a season-long competition in England and Wales that is contested by the members of the National Counties Cricket Association (NCCA), the so-called national counties that do not have first-class status.

History
The competition began in 1895, with the Worcestershire honorary secretary Paul Foley being influential in its creation. Apart from the two World War periods, it has been contested annually ever since. From 2014 to 2019 the tournament was known as the Unicorns Championship.

Four clubs which used to play in the Minor Counties Championship have been granted first-class status – Worcestershire in 1899; Northamptonshire in 1905; Glamorgan in 1921 and Durham in 1992.

Until 1959, when the Second XI Championship was founded, most second XIs of the first-class counties used to contest the Minor Counties. A few continued to do so and the last to withdraw was Somerset 2nd XI after the 1987 season.

Since 1983, the clubs have been split into an Eastern and a Western Division. The winners of the two divisions play each other in a match at the end of the season to determine which will be the Champions. Until 1983 all clubs competed in a single league. Teams played varying numbers of matches and did not play all other counties, so the table was ranked according to average points gained per match. The team with the highest average won the championship, except in a year when the top two counties had not played each other. In this case the second-placed team in the table had the right to challenge the leaders to a match to decide the championship. The second-placed team had to win this Challenge Match to take the title, with the league leaders being declared champions if they won or the game was drawn.

At present, there are twenty clubs involved. Nineteen represent English counties and the other is a Wales team that represents all the Welsh counties except Glamorgan. For details, see Minor counties of English cricket.

List of Minor Counties/National Counties Champions

Finals summary
In 1983, the then minor counties were divided into a Western Division and an Eastern Division, the winners of each division meeting in a final to decide the overall winner. From 1983 to 1993, the Championship was decided by a 55-over limited overs match. From 1994, the final was decided by a two-day, two-innings match with certain restrictions on the first innings, and from 1999 the final has been a three-day, two-innings match and only an outright result has decided the Championship.

Performance by county
 Bold denotes the current 20 National Counties.

See also
 National Counties of English and Welsh cricket
 Rowland Bowen, Cricket: A History of its Growth and Development, Eyre & Spottiswoode, 1970
 Playfair Cricket Annual
 Wisden Cricketers' Almanack

References

External links
 National Counties Cricket Association Official Site
 'Minor Counties' to become the National Counties Cricket Association from 2020

English domestic cricket competitions
National Counties cricket